Copionodon pecten is a species of catfishes (order Siluriformes) of the family Trichomycteridae. It is found in the Mucujê River, a tributary of Paraguaçu River in Bahia, Brazil.

References

Trichomycteridae
Fish of South America
Fauna of Brazil
Catfish genera
Freshwater fish genera
Taxa named by Mário Cesar Cardoso de Pinna
Fish described in 1992